Zvečan is a village in the municipality of Makedonski Brod, North Macedonia.

Demographics
According to the 2002 census, the village had a total of 70 inhabitants. Ethnic groups in the village include:

Macedonians 41
Albanians 4
Persons for whom data are taken from administrative sources 3

References

Villages in Makedonski Brod Municipality
Albanian communities in North Macedonia